Andriy Mikhalchuk (born 3 November 1967) is a retired Polish-Ukrainian professional footballer.

His career highlight was helping Widzew Łódź reach the Champions League group stage in 1996. This at the time meant that the president at the time Aleksander Kwaśniewski gave his support to granting him citizenship with a view to be called up to the national team; however ultimately he received his passport only after retirement from professional football, in 2005.

After retiring from football, he now works for the company "Gra Lech", specialising in fast-assembly tents and marquees.

Honours
 Polish Ekstraklasa champion: 1996, 1997.

References

1967 births
Living people
Soviet footballers
Soviet expatriate footballers
Footballers from Kyiv
Polish footballers
Ukrainian footballers
Ukrainian expatriate footballers
Expatriate footballers in Poland
Ukrainians in Poland
Ukrainian expatriate sportspeople in Poland
FC Aktobe players
Widzew Łódź players
Ekstraklasa players
Stal Głowno players
Association football midfielders
Naturalized citizens of Poland